Hyperolius quinquevittatus is a species of frog in the family Hyperoliidae.
It is found in Angola, Democratic Republic of the Congo, Malawi, Tanzania, Zambia, and possibly Mozambique.
Its natural habitats are moist savanna, subtropical or tropical high-altitude grassland, swamps, freshwater marshes, and intermittent freshwater marshes.

References

quinquevittatus
Amphibians described in 1866
Taxonomy articles created by Polbot